The 1891 Purdue football team was an American football team that represented Purdue University during the 1891 college football season. The team compiled a 4–0 record in the university's fourth season fielding an intercollegiate football team. For the 1891 season, Purdue hired Knowlton Ames as its football coach.  Ames played for Princeton from 1886 to 1889 and was considered one of the greatest players ever to play college football, after scoring 730 points for Princeton. The 1891 Purdue team shut out all four opponents, outscoring , ,Indiana, and | by a total of 194 to 0. Purdue's 60–0 victory over Indiana was the first installment in a rivalry which later became noted for the award of the Old Oaken Bucket trophy.

J. C. Teeters was the team captain.

Schedule

References

Purdue
Purdue Boilermakers football seasons
College football undefeated seasons
Purdue football